Spamilton: An American Parody is a musical parody of the Broadway show Hamilton. Written by Gerard Alessandrini, creator of the parody revue Forbidden Broadway, Spamilton also parodies several other musicals, including Gypsy, Chicago, The King and I, Assassins, Camelot, The Book of Mormon and Sweeney Todd, and personalities, like Patti LuPone, Audra McDonald, Stephen Sondheim, Stephen Schwartz, Barbra Streisand, Bernadette Peters, Carol Channing and Liza Minnelli.

The show, directed by Alessandrini, had its first preview on July 19, 2016, and opened on September 8, 2016, at New York's Triad Theatre. Originally scheduled to run 18 performances, it was extended at the Triad until May 28, 2017. It moved on June 2, 2017, to the 47th Street Theatre, near the Richard Rodgers Theatre where Hamilton is presented.

A Chicago production of Spamilton opened at the Royal George Theatre on March 12, 2017. A production ran at the Kirk Douglas Theatre in Culver City from November 5, 2017, to January 7, 2018, shortly before a national tour.

A production opened in London at the Menier Chocolate Factory running from July 24 (previews from July 12) to September 15, 2018.

Musical numbers
 "Lin-Manuel as Hamilton"
 "Aaron Burr, Sir, Nervous-er"
 "His Shot"
 "Look Around (The Schuyler Puppets)"
 "Lin-Manuel's Quest"
 "Ticket Beggar Woman"
 "Straight Guy's Winter's Prom"
 "Straight is Back"
 "What Did You Miss?"
 "Ben Franklin, Sondheim & Lin-Manuel"
 "Daveed Diggs - The Fresh Prince of Big Hair"
 "Rap Battle"
 "Ticket Beggar Woman #2"
 "Liza's 'Down With Rap'"
 "Ticket Beggar Woman #3"
 "One Big Song" (Written for Los Angeles production)
 "In the Hype"
 "Lin-Manuel & J-Lo, Beyoncé & Gloria Estefan"
 "Book of No More Mormons"
 "Broadway Assassins" 
 "Cool Duel"
 "Who Lives, Who Dies, Who Cries"
 "Lin-Manuel's New York City"
 "The Film When It Happens"
 "Finale: Raise a Glass to Broadway"
 "Encore: Our Shot"

Recordings

Original off-Broadway cast album (2017) 
The original off-Broadway cast recording for Spamilton was released by DRG Records on March 3, 2017.

Original casts

The show has the most racially diverse cast of any of Alessandrini's productions.

Critical response
Spamilton received positive reviews from critics. In his review of the Off-Broadway production, Ben Brantley in The New York Times called it a "smart, silly and often convulsively funny thesis, performed by a motor-mouthed cast that is fluent in many tongues". Frank Scheck, in his review of the Off-Broadway production for The Hollywood Reporter, wrote the musical "is so infectiously fun that it could easily run as long as its inspiration."

Marilyn Stasio in reviewing the Off-Broadway production in Variety, wrote, "Like the original show, the pants are tight, the boots are shiny, the bosoms are uplifting and the vests show just enough chest to look manly. Switch-hitting as director/choreographer, Alessandrini assigns his performers signature moves that make each character look authentic, if ever-so-slightly goofy. Getting those physical details right lays the groundwork for the witty character impersonations to come."

Hamilton creator Lin-Manuel Miranda and director Thomas Kail both attended a performance. Miranda praised the parody, saying, "I laughed my brains out."

Awards

References

External links 

Hamilton (musical)
Off-Broadway musicals
2016 musicals
Musical parodies